Highway 18 (AR 18 and Hwy. 18) is an east–west state highway of  in Northeast Arkansas.

Route description
AR 18 begins at AR 69 near Jacksonport. Brief concurrencies begins with AR 17 and US 67 (Future I-57) in Newport, and Arkansas Highway 18S leads to Newport Municipal Airport as AR 18 continues east. The route runs east to AR 37 in Grubbs before turning north at Uno to AR 226 in Cash. AR 18 joins AR 91 and becomes King's Highway.

AR 18/AR 91 run together with US 63 into Jonesboro. AR 18 breaks and runs as Highland Dr., meeting US 49/AR 1. After Jonesboro, AR 18 meets AR 158 and AR 135 in Lake City. The three routes continue east to Black Oak, when AR 18 turns north. AR 18 briefly runs with AR 139 in Monette before continuing east. AR 18B is created in Manila, and AR 18 meets AR 77.

The route briefly meets AR 181 near Dell before turning northeast to Blytheville. AR 18 meets AR 151 and US 61 in downtown Blytheville. The route continues east to cross over Interstate 55 (exit 67) in a frontage road interchange. AR 18 and AR 312 meet briefly south of the Blytheville Municipal Airport. The route continues to terminate at the Mississippi River at the Tennessee state line.

Major intersections
Mile markers reset at some concurrencies.

History

Highway 18 was created during the 1926 Arkansas state highway numbering from Diaz to Barfield similar to the present-day alignment. The designation was shifted onto Nettleton Cut-Off Road in Jonesboro on March 9, 1955. The highway was rerouted between Leachville and Manilla on July 10, 1957, with Highway 18 taking over the former alignment of Highway 18 Spur. It was extended to Barfield Landing on April 24, 1963 as part of a major expansion of the state highway system. The western terminus was extended west to Highway 69 in Jacksonport on November 23, 1966.

Auxiliary routes

See also

 List of state highways in Arkansas

References

External links

Crowley's Ridge Parkway
018
Transportation in Jackson County, Arkansas
Transportation in Poinsett County, Arkansas
Transportation in Craighead County, Arkansas
Transportation in Mississippi County, Arkansas
1926 establishments in Arkansas